The Tower of the Seven Hunchbacks (Spanish:La Torre de los Siete Jorobados) is a 1944 Spanish mystery film directed by Edgar Neville. It is based on a novel of the same title by Emilio Carrere.

Plot 
Basilio is a superstitious young man who courts the singer . Looking for money to invite her and her mother, he gambles. He wins a small fortune following the advice of Robinsón de Mantua. He is revealed to be the ghost of an archeologist dead after an apparent suicide. Basilio is attracted to Inés, who happens to be the niece of Professor Mantua. She refuses the verdict of suicide and asks for his help. Basilio is helped by his friend, a police agent. They discover a passage from Mantua's home into an underground city under Habsburg Madrid, founded by Jews escaping their 1492 expulsion and now inhabited by money-forging hunchbacks led by Dr. Sabatino. The hunchbacks hold Inés and an archeologist friend of Mantua and try to force Basilio into staying. Basilio manages to escape and returns with the police to find Inés at her home, who barely remembers what happened. The police chief wants to arrest Basilio, but Inés intercedes. Meanwhile, Sabatino has blown down the tunnels.

Themes 
The film features antisemitic tropes as core element of the plot, namely the appearance of a subterranean city dwelled by nefarious hunchbacks, founded by Jews back in 1492.
The idea that the hunchbacks are the descendants of the Jews is not explicit, though.

Cast
Antonio Casal as Basilio Beltrán
Isabel de Pomés as Inés
Guillermo Marín as Doctor Sabatino
Félix de Pomés as Don Robinson de Mantua
Julia Lajos as Madre de la 'Bella Medusa'
Julia Pachelo as Braulia
Manolita Morán as La 'Bella Medusa'
Antonio Riquelme as Don Zacarías
José Franco as Espectro de Napoleón
Manuel Miranda
Emilio Barta
Antonio L. Estrada
Luis Ballester
Luis Latorre
Rosario Royo
Julián García
Francisco Zabala
Natalia Daina
Carmen García
José Arias
Antonio Zaballos

References

Bibliography
 Mira, Alberto. The A to Z of Spanish Cinema. Rowman & Littlefield, 2010.

External links
 

1944 films
1944 horror films
1940s comedy thriller films
1944 mystery films
1940s ghost films
1940s historical horror films
Films based on Spanish novels
Spanish historical films
1940s Spanish-language films
Spanish black-and-white films
Films set in Madrid
Films directed by Edgar Neville
Films set in the 19th century
Spanish mystery films
Spanish horror films
Antisemitism in Spain
Antisemitic films
1944 comedy films
Films set in subterranea
Fictional hunchbacks
1944 musical films
Spanish musical films
1940s Spanish films